Tiarella austrina is a species of flowering plant in the family Saxifragaceae. The specific name austrina means "from the south". Being endemic to the southeastern United States, it is sometimes referred to as the southern foamflower. It is one of two species of Tiarella that spread by stolons (the other being Tiarella stolonifera).

Description
Tiarella austrina is a perennial, herbaceous plant with a short, slender rhizome. It has a leafy flowering stem and relatively large basal leaves with an extended terminal lobe. Most importantly, the species has the ability to produce stolons.

Identification
To positively identify Tiarella austrina, all of the following key features must be verified (in any order):

 Stolon present
 Basal leaves usually longer than wide
 Basal leaf lobes usually acute-acuminate with the terminal lobe prominently extended
 Flowering stem usually with 1–2 leaves or foliaceous bracts

The key features listed above are similar to those of Tiarella nautila but the presence of the stolon rules out that species.

Taxonomy
In 1937, Olga Lakela described Tiarella cordifolia var. austrina, a variety of T. cordifolia with stolons. Guy Nesom raised this variety to species rank in 2021. Consequently, Tiarella cordifolia var. austrina  is a basionym for Tiarella austrina .

Distribution
In eastern North America, Tiarella austrina is narrowly endemic to the southeastern United States where it occurs mainly in the southern Blue Ridge Mountains of southwestern North Carolina, southeastern Tennessee, northeastern Georgia, and northwestern South Carolina. 
Counties where the species is known to occur include:

 Alabama: Jackson, Madison
 Georgia: Dawson, Habersham, Rabun, Stephens, Towns, White
 North Carolina: Buncombe, Cherokee, Clay, Graham, Haywood, Henderson, Jackson, Macon, Polk, Swain, Transylvania
 South Carolina: Greenville, Oconee, Pickens
 Tennessee: Blount, Cocke, Franklin, Monroe, Sevier

The ranges of Tiarella austrina and Tiarella nautila overlap in Georgia (Dawson, Towns, White), North Carolina (Cherokee), and Tennessee (Monroe). Both Tiarella austrina and Tiarella stolonifera occur in Buncombe County, North Carolina. A small disjunct population of T. austrina overlaps Tiarella wherryi in northeastern Alabama (Jackson, Madison) and adjacent south-central Tennessee (Franklin).

Conservation
The global conservation status of Tiarella austrina is unknown. It is uncommon (S3) in North Carolina.

References

Bibliography
 
 
 

austrina
Flora of the United States
Flora of the Southeastern United States
Flora of the Appalachian Mountains
Plants described in 1937
Taxa named by Guy L. Nesom
Flora without expected TNC conservation status